Killing the Dead is a 2019 Paraguayan thriller drama film directed by Hugo Giménez. It was selected as the Paraguayan entry for the Best International Feature Film at the 93rd Academy Awards, but it was not nominated.

Plot
During the dictatorship in Paraguay in the 1970s, two men who are secretly burying the dead, realise that one of the corpses is still alive.

Cast
 Ever Enciso
 Aníbal Ortiz
 Silvio Rodas
 Jorge Román

See also
 List of submissions to the 93rd Academy Awards for Best International Feature Film
 List of Paraguayan submissions for the Academy Award for Best International Feature Film

References

External links
 

2019 films
2019 drama films
2019 thriller films
2019 thriller drama films
Guaraní-language films
2010s Spanish-language films
Paraguayan thriller films
Paraguayan drama films